Claude Fournier (July 23, 1931 – March 16, 2023) was a Canadian film director, screenwriter, editor and cinematographer. He is one of the forerunners of the Cinema of Quebec. He was the twin brother of Guy Fournier.

Career 
Claude Fournier began his career in journalism then moved to the Radio-Canada as a news cameraman. He joined the National Film Board of Canada in 1957 as a writer and director, and he worked on early cinéma-vérité films such as À Saint-Henri le cinq septembre and La lutte. He left the Board to work in the United States with famed documentary filmmakers Richard Leacock and D.A. Pennebaker, then returned to Montreal in 1963 to set up his own production company, Rose Films.

In 1970, he directed Two Women in Gold (Deux femmes en or), one of the most successful Quebec films of its time. In the private sector, Fournier produced over 100 short films, co-wrote the Sophia Loren film A Special Day, a Canada-Italy co-production that was nominated for an Oscar, and directed The Tin Flute with Marilyn Lightstone and The Book of Eve with Claire Bloom. The Tin Flute was entered into the 13th Moscow International Film Festival. His 1988 TV series The Mills of Power (Les Tisserands du pouvoir) won him a Gémeaux Award for best direction of a television drama and a Genie Award for Best Screenplay.

Donald Sutherland described him as "one of the truly wretched directors of the world."

Also a published poet, novelist and essayist, Claude Fournier is one of the most durable and respected Quebec filmmakers of his generation.

Death 
Claude Fournier died at the Montreal University Hospital Centre on 16 March 2023, at the age of 91. He had been hospitalised after suffering a heart attack during a trip to Martinique.

Filmography

Features 
Two Women in Gold (Deux femmes en or) —  1970
The Master Cats (Les chats bottés) —  1971
Alien Thunder —  1974
The Apple, the Stem and the Seeds (La pomme, la queue et les pépins) —  1974
Far from You Sweetheart (Je suis loin de toi mignonne) —  1976
The Clean Up Squad (Les chiens chauds) —  1980
The Tin Flute (Bonheur d'occasion) —  1983
Page trois: un ordinateur au coeur —  1985
Heads or Tails (J'en suis!) —  1997
The Book of Eve (Histoires d'Ève) —  2003
My Only Love (Je n'aime que toi) —  2004

Documentaries 
Télésphore Légaré, garde-pêche (Short film, 1959)
Alfred Desrochers, poète (Short film, 1960)
La France sur un caillou (Short film Co-Directed with Gilles Groulx, 1961)
La lutte (Short film Co-Directed with Michel Brault, Marcel Carrière and Claude Jutra, 1961)
Midwestern Floods (Short film, 1962)
Nehru (Short film, 1962)
Vingt ans express (Series of 7 shorts, 1963–1964)
Nomades de l'ouest (Short film, 1963)
Calgary Stampede (Short film, 1965)
Deux femmes (Short film, 1965)
Columbium (Short film, 1966)
Londres (Short film, 1966)
On sait où entrer Tony, mais c'est les notes (Short film, 1966)
Québec an 2000 (Short film co-directed with Aimée Danis, 1966)
Sebring, La cinquième heure (Short film, 1966)
Ti-Jean (Short film, 1966)
Tony Roman (Short film, 1966)
Du général au particulier (Short film, 1967)
Canada Today (Short film of Expo 67, 1967)
La greffe cardiaque (Short film, 1969)
La greffe cardiaque, symposium de Montréal (Short film, 1969)
Coeurs neufs (Short film a.k.a. Hearts, 1969)
Le dossier Nelligan (1969)
...Et Dieu créa l'été (Short film Co-Directed with Marie-José Raymond, 1974)
Aliments, gentils aliments (Short film Co-Directed with Marie-José Raymond, 1975)

Television 
The Newcomers —  TV miniseries, 1977)
The New Avengers —  TV series, 1977
Tales of the Klondike —  TV miniseries a.k.a. The Scorn of Women, 1981
The Mills of Power (Les tisserands du pouvoir) —  TV miniseries, 1987
Golden Fiddles —  TV miniseries, 1990
Juliette Pomerleau —  TV miniseries, 1999
Félix Leclerc: Les esprits du fleuve —  TV miniseries, 2005

References

External links 

1931 births
2023 deaths
Canadian screenwriters in French
Screenwriters from Quebec
Film directors from Quebec
People from Montérégie
Canadian cinematographers
French Quebecers
National Film Board of Canada people
Canadian twins